Sherry D. Jackson (born February 15, 1942) is an American retired actress and former child star.

Early life
Jackson was born on February 15, 1942. Her mother provided drama, singing, and dancing lessons for Sherry and her two brothers, Curtis L. Jackson, Jr., and Gary L. Jackson, beginning in their formative years. After her husband died in 1948, Maurita moved the family from Wendell to Los Angeles, California.

By one account Maurita, who had been told while still in Idaho that her children should be in films, was referred to a theatrical agent by a tour bus driver whom they met in Los Angeles. According to another, she was referred by the friend of an agent who saw Sherry eating ice cream on the Sunset Strip. Apocryphal perhaps, but within the year Sherry had her first screen test, for The Snake Pit with Olivia de Havilland, and by the age of seven appeared in her first feature film, the 1949 musical You're My Everything, which starred Anne Baxter and Dan Dailey.

In 1950, young Sherry became friends with actor Steve Cochran while working with him on The Lion and the Horse. Steve introduced his friend, writer Montgomery Pittman, to Sherry's widowed mother. A romance developed, and Pittman married Maurita Jackson in a small ceremony on June 4, 1952, in Torrance, California, with Sherry as flower girl and younger brother Gary as ring-bearer; Cochran himself was Pittman's best man. In 1955 Cochran hired Pittman to write his next film, Come Next Spring, the first that Cochran produced himself. Sherry played the part of Cochran's mute daughter Annie Ballot, a role Pittman wrote specifically for his step-daughter.

During the course of appearing in several of the Ma and Pa Kettle movies during the 1950s as Susie Kettle, one of the titular couple's numerous children, Jackson also appeared in The Breaking Point, which starred John Garfield in his penultimate film role. In 1952 she portrayed the emotionally volatile visionary and ascetic Jacinta Marto in The Miracle of Our Lady of Fatima and the following year played John Wayne's daughter in the football-themed Trouble Along the Way.

Make Room for Daddy

Jackson may be best remembered for her five-season run as older daughter Terry Williams on The Danny Thomas Show (known as Make Room for Daddy during the first three seasons) from 1953 to 1958. During the course of her five years on the series, she established a strong bond with her on-screen mother, Jean Hagen, but Hagen left the series after the third season in 1956.

Worn out from the relentless pace of the production, Jackson left the program at the beginning of season six, once her five-year contract expired. To allow the writers to finish the character off, actress Penny Parker appeared in the role for fourteen episodes of season seven, in which the character gets married and moves away. Jackson's impact on the Danny Thomas viewing audience was such that, on February 8, 1960, she received a star for "Television" at 6324 Hollywood Blvd. on the Hollywood Walk of Fame.  Jackson did return as Terry for the premiere episode of the new series Make Room for Granddaddy in 1970.

Later roles
Over the next few years, Jackson broadened her range of acting roles by guest starring in dozens of television series, appearing as a hit woman on 77 Sunset Strip, a freed Apache captive who yearns to return to the reservation on The Tall Man, an alcoholic on Mr. Novak, a woman accused of murder on Perry Mason, and an unstable mother-to-be on Wagon Train. Sherry also appeared as a first season guest on The Rifleman episode “The Sister” playing the part of a horse riding sibling of two doting brothers. She played a gunslinger's promiscuous young bride in the Western series Maverick episode entitled "Red Dog" with Roger Moore, Lee Van Cleef and John Carradine. After a 1965 appearance on Gomer Pyle, U.S.M.C., she then made guest appearances on Lost in Space ("The Space Croppers", reuniting with her Danny Thomas co-star, Angela Cartwright), My Three Sons, Gunsmoke, Rawhide, The Wild Wild West ("The Night of the Vicious Valentine" and "The Night of the Gruesome Games", as two different characters), Batman, and the original Star Trek ("What Are Little Girls Made Of?").

When Blake Edwards remade the television series Peter Gunn as a feature film entitled Gunn (1967), Jackson was filmed in a nude scene that appeared only in the international version, not the U.S. release. Stills of the nude scene appeared in the August 1967 issue of Playboy magazine, in a pictorial entitled "Make Room For Sherry". The movie has not yet been released on VHS or DVD.

In 1968 Jackson co-starred in The Mini-Skirt Mob as a member of an all-female motorcycle gang, and appeared in the 1973 film Cotter opposite Don Murray and Carol Lynley. In subsequent years she appeared in TV movies such as Wild Women (1970), Hitchhike! (1974), The Girl on the Late, Late Show (1974), Returning Home (1975), Enigma (1977), The Curse of the Moon Child (1977) and Casino (1980).

In the 1970s through early 1980s she made guest appearances on such TV shows as Love, American Style, The Rockford Files, Starsky & Hutch, The Blue Knight, Switch, The Streets of San Francisco, Barnaby Jones, The Incredible Hulk, Fantasy Island, Vega$, Alice, Charlie's Angels and CHiPs.

Personal life
Jackson never married or had children. 

In 1967, she began a five-year relationship with business executive and horse breeder Fletcher R. Jones. On November 7, 1972, Jones was killed in a plane crash eight miles east of Santa Ynez Airport in Santa Barbara County, California. Five months after Jones's death, Jackson filed a palimony suit against his estate, asking for more than $1 million (equivalent to $ million in ), with her attorneys stating that Jones had promised to provide her with at least $25,000 a year for the rest of her life.

Filmography

Film

Television

References

Bibliography
 Best, Marc. Those Endearing Young Charms: Child Performers of the Screen, South Brunswick and New York: Barnes & Co., 1971, pp. 122–127.

External links

1942 births
Living people
People from Wendell, Idaho
American child actresses
American film actresses
American television actresses
Actresses from Idaho
Actresses from Los Angeles
21st-century American women